Phosphene Dream is the third album from rock band The Black Angels. It was released on September 13, 2010, in the UK and September 14, 2010, in the United States by Blue Horizon.  This is the first album the Black Angels released with Blue Horizon, having previously worked with Light in the Attic Records. The album debuted in the US at #52 on the Billboard Top 200 Charts.

Track listing

Bonus tracks
 "Melanie's Melody" [iTunes]
 "Ronettes" [iTunes]
 "My Boat Is Sinking" [Amazon]
 "Choose to Choose" [Napster]
 "Entrance Song (Raindance Version)" [Napster]
 "At Night" [Shockhound]

In popular culture

 "Bad Vibrations" was featured in the 2012 video game Spec Ops: The Line.
 "Bad Vibrations" was featured in the 2014 HBO comedy "Silicon Valley".
"Entrance Song" was used in a Target commercial and also in the 2016 movie "Assassin's Creed".

References

The Black Angels (band) albums
2010 albums
Albums produced by Dave Sardy